Winning Time: The Rise of the Lakers Dynasty is an American sports drama television series created by Max Borenstein and Jim Hecht for HBO, based on the book Showtime: Magic, Kareem, Riley, and the Los Angeles Lakers Dynasty of the 1980s by Jeff Pearlman. The first season, comprising 10 episodes, chronicles the 1980s Showtime era of the  Los Angeles Lakers basketball team (beginning in late 1979), featuring notable NBA stars Magic Johnson and Kareem Abdul-Jabbar. It features an ensemble cast led by John C. Reilly, Jason Clarke, Jason Segel, Gaby Hoffmann, Rob Morgan, and Adrien Brody. The series premiered on March 6, 2022, with the pilot episode directed by Adam McKay. In April 2022, the series was renewed for a second season.

Premise
The series is a dramatization of the professional and personal lives of the 1980s Los Angeles Lakers basketball teams.

Cast

Main
 John C. Reilly as Jerry Buss
 Quincy Isaiah as Magic Johnson
 Jason Clarke as Jerry West
 Adrien Brody as Pat Riley
 Gaby Hoffmann as Claire Rothman
 Tracy Letts as Jack McKinney
 Jason Segel as Paul Westhead
 Julianne Nicholson as Cranny McKinney
 Hadley Robinson as Jeanie Buss
 DeVaughn Nixon as Norm Nixon
 Solomon Hughes as Kareem Abdul-Jabbar
 Tamera Tomakili as Earletha "Cookie" Kelly
 Brett Cullen as Bill Sharman
 Stephen Adly Guirgis as Frank Mariani
 Spencer Garrett as Chick Hearn
 Sarah Ramos as Cheryl Pistono
 Molly Gordon as Linda Zafrani
 Joey Brooks as Lon Rosen
 Delante Desouza as Michael Cooper
 Jimel Atkins as Jamaal Wilkes
 Austin Aaron as Mark Landsberger
 Jon Young as Brad Holland
 Rob Morgan as Earvin Johnson Sr.
 Sally Field as Jessie Buss

Recurring
 Michael Chiklis as Red Auerbach
 LisaGay Hamilton as Christine Johnson
 Michael O'Keefe as Jack Kent Cooke
Kate Arrington as JoAnn Mueller
 Sean Patrick Small as Larry Bird
 David Purdham as Larry O'Brien
 Kirk Bovill as Donald Sterling
 Rickey Eugene Brown as Quincy Johnson
 Darone Okolie as Larry Johnson
 Andy Hirsch as David Stern
 Lola Kirke as Karen West
 Rachel Hilson as Cindy Day
 Steve Harris as Dr. Thomas Day
 Carter Redwood as Brian
 Lucy Walters as Beverly
 Gillian Jacobs as Chris Riley
 Rory Cochrane as Jerry Tarkanian
 Danny Burstein as Vic Weiss
 Ta'Nika Gibson as Debbie Allen
 Terence Davis as Adrian Dantley
 Rodney Barnes as Maurice
 Nell Sherman as Maude
 Newton Mayenge as Jim Chones
 Wood Harris as Spencer Haywood
 Edwin Hodge as Ron Boone
 Ja'Quan Cole as Ron Carter
 Jynediah Gittens as Kenny Carr
 Michael AG Scott as Butch Lee
 Mike Epps as Richard Pryor
 Max E. Williams as Jack Nicholson
 Carina Conti as Paula Abdul
 Mariama Diallo as Iman
 Orlando Jones as Elgin Baylor
 James Lesure as Julius Erving

Episodes

Production

Development
On April 20, 2014, screenwriter Jim Hecht flew across the country to the home of sportswriter Jeff Pearlman. He pitched an adaptation of Pearlman's best-seller Showtime: Magic, Kareem, Riley and the Los Angeles Lakers Dynasty that would be similar to the TV show Friday Night Lights. According to The Hollywood Reporter, Hecht brought Pearlman a bottle of nonalcoholic wine, a block of chocolate, and a tomato as an offering to convince Pearlman to sell him the rights to the book. "I had no money, so if he'd been like, '$30,000,' I would've been screwed," Hecht recalled. Pearlman, who had optioned several of his books where "nothing ever happened", agreed to let Hecht shop his book around town for a year. In 2015, producer Kevin Messick convinced Adam McKay to direct the pilot and produce.

In April 2019, HBO ordered a pilot of the series, which was written by Max Borenstein with a story by Borenstein and Hecht. The series was initially referred to by the working title Showtime, after Pearlman's book and the Lakers era that inspired it. By that summer, the series was described as being untitled, with HBO executive Casey Bloys later acknowledging that the title would have caused marketplace confusion given that one of HBO's direct premium TV and streaming competitors is also named Showtime. In December, HBO officially greenlit a series order. On December 8, 2021, HBO announced that the series would be titled Winning Time: The Rise of the Lakers Dynasty; according to Bloys, "Winning Time" is a phrase that was already associated with Magic Johnson.

On April 7, 2022, HBO renewed the series for a second season.

Casting
Francine Maisler is the show's casting director. In August 2019, Jason Clarke and Michael Shannon were cast to portray Jerry West and Jerry Buss respectively. However, the next month Shannon would exit due to creative differences, and Buss would be recast with John C. Reilly. Shannon reportedly did not like the fourth wall breaking format of the show and found it difficult to work with. Will Ferrell had actively pursued the role of Buss since McKay had first started developing the series; however, McKay did not feel he was right for the role and instead cast Reilly without telling Ferrell. Upon learning of the decision via a phone call from Reilly, Ferrell was so infuriated that he ended his friendship and professional relationship with McKay. Quincy Isaiah and Solomon Hughes were additionally cast to play Magic Johnson and Kareem Abdul Jabbar after an extensive casting search. DeVaughn Nixon was added to the cast to portray Norm Nixon.

By March 2021, additional castings including Adrien Brody, Sally Field, Michael Chiklis, Bo Burnham, Jason Segel, Sarah Ramos, Brett Cullen, and Lola Kirke were announced. In May 2021, Rory Cochrane, Danny Burstein, Austin Aaron, Ta'Nika Gibson, Edwin Hodge, Terence Davis, and Ja'Quan Cole joined the cast. In June 2021, Mike Epps, Max E. Williams, Carina Conti and Mariama Diallo joined the cast. In August 2021, Burnham exited the project due to scheduling conflicts while Sean Patrick Small, Rachel Hilson, Olli Haaskivi, Newton Mayenge, and Jon Young joined the cast, with Small replacing Burnham.

Filming
Principal photography for the first season began in Los Angeles on April 12, 2021, and concluded on October 31. It was confirmed via Twitter that production on the second season started on August 24, 2022.

Release
Alongside the title announcement in December 2021, HBO announced the series would debut in March 2022, with the premiere date subsequently set for Sunday, March 6 and aired an episode weekly, concluding the season on May 8, 2022.

Home media
The first season was released on October 4, 2022, on Blu-ray and DVD.

Reception

Critical response
On review aggregator website Rotten Tomatoes, the series holds an 84% approval rating based on 56 critic reviews, with an average rating of 7.6/10. The website's critics consensus reads, "Gleefully excessive in both form and function, Winning Time pairs a larger-than-life roster of characters with whiplash style to deliver an absolute slam dunk." On Metacritic, the series has a score of 68 out of 100, based on 29 critic reviews, indicating "generally favorable reviews".

Reactions from Lakers 
The series received criticism from Magic Johnson and Kareem Abdul-Jabbar for historical inaccuracies. Johnson said he would not watch the series because it never depicted the Showtime era accurately, while Abdul-Jabbar referred to the series as deliberately dishonest. On April 19, 2022, Jerry West demanded a retraction from HBO within two weeks for the  "cruel" and "deliberately false" depiction of him as a temperamental, foul-mouthed executive prone to angry outbursts and mood swings. A week later, HBO responded to West with the following statement: "HBO has a long history of producing compelling content drawn from actual facts and events that are fictionalized in part for dramatic purposes. Winning Time is not a documentary and has not been presented as such. However, the series and its depictions are based on extensive factual research and reliable sourcing, and HBO stands resolutely behind our talented creators and cast who have brought a dramatization of this epic chapter in basketball history to the screen." West, in turn, has said that he intends to pursue legal action against HBO for defamation, even if he has to "take this all the way to the Supreme Court." Spencer Haywood, on the other hand, called his portrayal on the series a blessing.

Ratings

Accolades

References

External links
 
 

2022 American television series debuts
American sports television series
2020s American drama television series
Basketball television series
HBO original programming
Los Angeles Lakers
Television controversies in the United States
Television series set in the 1980s
Television shows based on non-fiction books
Television shows filmed in Los Angeles
Television shows set in Los Angeles
Television series by Home Box Office